House of Sand and Fog may refer to:

 House of Sand and Fog (novel), a 1999 novel by Andre Dubus III
 House of Sand and Fog (film), a 2003 film adaptation of the novel, starring Jennifer Connelly and Ben Kingsley
 House of Sand and Fog (soundtrack), the soundtrack album from the film